John Gayle may refer to:

 John Gayle (Alabama politician) (1792–1859), governor of Alabama (1831–1835)
 John Gayle (footballer) (born 1964), English football (soccer) player
 Johnny Gayle (1923–2020), West Indian cricket umpire

See also
 John Gale (disambiguation)